67 Special are an Australian rock band based in Melbourne, Australia. The band was formed in 2001, and went on to release two full-length albums.

History 
In 1994, Ash Santilla and Gavin Campbell met at high school in their hometown of Benalla, Victoria, and became good friends sharing their passion for rock music. Their first band was called Naybious, named after Gavin's sister Lauren's one-eyed doll.

Lead vocalist Santilla and lead guitarist Campbell met multi-instrumentalist Louis Macklin at a school camp, and he became the band's keyboardist and percussionist. Progress of the band stalled for some time, until 2001 when Santilla and Campbell found each other again in Melbourne and began writing again. Soon, drummer Ben Dexter joined after coming to know the group through his brother, and bass guitarist Bryan Dochstader joined the group after noticing the group unloading gear in a supermarket car-park and asking them, "Do you guys need a bass player?"

The band couldn't decide on a name for several months until Dexter rang Santilla and asked him, "What's the model of your car?" "HR," Santilla replied. "What year?" "'67." "67 Special?" "Yeah."

67 Special signed with Festival Mushroom Records released the "Hey There Bomb" in 2004. The song peaked at number 100 on the ARIA Charts.  Their debut album The World Can Wait was released in August 2005. 

The second studio album was released by Warner Music Australia in 2007.

Personnel
 Ash Santilla – lead vocals, guitar
 Gavin Campbell – lead guitar
 Bryan Dochstader – bass guitar, vocals
 Ben Dexter – drums
 Louis Macklin – keyboards, percussion

Discography

Albums

Singles

Footnotes

References

External links
 67Special.com Official band website (requires Macromedia Flash plugin)
  Myspace site
  Sydney Morning Herald interview with Ash
  The Dwarf's 67Special Content
  Australian Music Online
 Undercover.com.au Undercover's video interview with 67 Special from 11 October 2004 (requires either Windows Media Player or RealPlayer plugins)
 AccessAllAreas.net.au Access All Areas' interview with 67 Special from mid-2005 (scroll down a bit)
 ReachOut.com.au 'Clued-Up' Interview with drummer Ben Dexter in mid-2005.
Album Review Xdafied.com.au
 Mushroom Music Publishing

Australian rock music groups